The Sam Waller Museum is a museum dedicated to preserving the history and artifacts of this region of northern Manitoba. The collections include First Nations, fur trading, mining, transportation (from the steamboat to the railway and aviation era). The museum is in the old courthouse, located in downtown The Pas, Manitoba.

The highlight of the museum’s year is the Northern Manitoba Trappers' Festival held annually in mid-February in The Pas, Manitoba.

External links
 Sam Waller Museum
 Northern Manitoba Trappers Festival

History museums in Manitoba
The Pas